Syntretus is a genus of parasitic wasps of adult bumblebees.

References 

 Achterberg, C., van; Haeselbarth, E. 2003: Revision of the genus Syntretus Foerster (Hymenoptera: Braconidae: Euphorinae) from Europe. Zoologische mededelingen, 77, pages 9–78. 
 Gloag, R.; Shaw, S.R.; Burwell, C. 2009: A new species of Syntretus Foerster (Hymenoptera: Braconidae: Euphorinae), a parasitoid of the stingless bee Trigona carbonaria Smith (Hymenoptera: Apidae: Meliponinae). Australian journal of entomology, 48, pages 8–14, 

Euphorinae
Braconidae genera